Andina is a restaurant serving Peruvian cuisine in Portland, Oregon's Pearl District, in the United States. The restaurant was the third largest Hispanic business in the U.S. state of Oregon, as of 2020.

Description 
Eater Portland has said the restaurant serves Novo-Andean cuisine.

Reception 
Kara Stokes and Maya MacEvoy included the restaurant in Eater Portland 2022 overview of recommended eateries in the Pearl District.

See also
 Hispanics and Latinos in Portland, Oregon

References

External links

 

Year of establishment missing
Latin American restaurants in Portland, Oregon
Pearl District, Portland, Oregon
Peruvian American
Peruvian restaurants